The 17th Annual D.I.C.E. Awards is the 17th edition of the D.I.C.E. Awards, an annual awards event that honors the best games in the video game industry. It was also held as part of the Academy's 2014 D.I.C.E. Summit, and was hosted by Felicia Day and Freddie Wong.

The Last of Us received the most nominations and won the most awards, including Game of the Year. Sony Computer Entertainment published the most nominees and published the most award winners.

Rockstar Games co-founders Sam Houser and Dan Houser, along with Leslie Benzies, former president of Rockstar North received the of the Academy of Interactive Arts & Sciences Hall of Fame Award. Eugene Jarvis programmer behind arcade games Defender and Robotron: 2084, received the Pioneer Award.

Winners and Nominees
Winners are listed first, highlighted in boldface, and indicated with a double dagger.

Special Awards

Hall of Fame
 Sam Houser
 Dan Houser
 Leslie Benzies

Pioneer
 Eugene Jarvis

Games with multiple nominations and awards

The following 23 games received multiple nominations:

The following three games received multiple awards:

Companies with multiple nominations

Companies that received multiple nominations as either a developer or a publisher.

Companies that received multiple awards as either a developer or a publisher.

External links

References

2014 awards
2014 awards in the United States
February 2014 events in the United States
2013 in video gaming
D.I.C.E. Award ceremonies